The list of shipwrecks in 1931 includes ships sunk, foundered, grounded, or otherwise lost during 1931.

January

1 January

2 January

5 January

6 January

7 January

10 January

12 January

13 January

17 January

18 January

19 January

20 January

22 January

23 January

25 January

26 January

27 January

30 January

31 January

Unknown date

February

1 February

2 February

5 February

6 February

7 February

10 February

12 February

13 February

17 February

18 February

19 February

21 February

22 February

24 February

25 February

26 February

27 February

28 February

Unknown date

March

1 March

5 March

6 March

7 March

8 March

9 March

11 March

13 March

14 March

15 March

16 March

17 March

19 March

20 March

21 March

23 March

24 March

27 March

28 March

29 March

30 March

April

2 April

3 April

4 April

7 April

9 April

10 April

13 April

14 April

15 April

17 April

18 April

20 April

21 April

23 April

25 April

27 April

28 April

30 April

May

4 May

6 May

7 May

8 May

10 May

12 May

13 May

14 May

15 May

17 May

22 May

26 May

27 May

28 May

30 May

June

5 June

7 June

9 June

11 June

12 June

13 June

14 June

17 June

18 June

19 June

20 June

22 June

23 June

27 June

28 June

29 June

July

1 July

3 July

4 July

7 July

8 July

10 July

11 July

12 July

15 July

17 July

18 July

19 July

20 July

21 July

22 July

23 July

27 July

30 July

August

2 August

3 August

6 August

7 August

8 August

11 August

12 August

13 August

14 August

15 August

17 August

18 August

21 August

23 August

25 August

26 August

27 August

28 August

31 August

September

1 September

2 September

3 September

4 September

5 September

7 September

8 September

9 September

10 September

12 September

13 September

15 September

16 September

18 September

19 September

22 September

23 September

24 September

25 September

27 September

28 September

29 September

October

1 October

2 October

3 October

5 October

6 October

11 October

12 October

13 October

15 October

16 October

17 October

19 October

21 October

22 October

23 October

27 October

28 October

31 October

November

1 November

3 November

4 November

6 November

7 November

8 November

11 November

12 November

15 November

17 November

18 November

19 November
For the loss of the British ocean liner Bermuda on this day, see the entry for 17 June 1931

20 November

21 November

22 November

23 November

24 November

25 November

27 November

28 November

29 November

30 November

December

1 December

3 December

4 December

5 December

6 December

7 December

8 December

9 December

13 December

14 December

16 December

19 December

21 December

24 December

25 December

26 December

28 December

29 December

31 December

Unknown date

Unknown date

References

1931
Shipwrecks